One Last Breath may refer to:

 "One Last Breath" (Creed song), 2001
 "One Last Breath" (Maria Elena Kyriakou song), 2015